A Blue Grit, also known as a Blue Liberal or Business Liberal, is a member or supporter of the Liberal Party of Canada, or many of the provincial Liberal parties, who adheres to fiscal conservatism and is supportive of austerity and pro-business policies while being socially progressive. Blue Grits are thus right-leaning fiscally and but left-leaning socially. The term has also been applied to former Progressive Conservative Party of Canada members who are now Liberals, such as Scott Brison, David Orchard, and John Herron.

Notable adherents 
Notable Blue Grits include:

 John Turner, Prime Minister of Canada (1984) and minister of finance (1972–1975) 
 Paul Martin, Prime Minister of Canada (2003–2006) and minister of finance (1993–2003)
 John Manley, Deputy Prime Minister (2002–2003), minister of finance (2003–2003) and minister of industry (1995–2000) 
 Martha Hall Findlay, Liberal leadership candidate in 2006 and 2013
 Frank McKenna, Premier of New Brunswick (1987–1997)
 Roy MacLaren, minister of state for finance (1983–1984), minister of national revenue (1984) and minister for international trade (1993–1996)

See also
Red Tory
Blue Tory
Moderates (Liberal Party of Australia)
New Democrats
Rockefeller Republican
Third Way
Classical liberalism
Conservative liberalism

References

Canadian political phrases
Political party factions in Canada